Nobody Dies Twice (Spanish: Nadie muere dos veces) is a 1953 Mexican thriller film directed by Luis Spota and starring Abel Salazar, Luis Aguilar and Lilia del Valle.

Cast
 Abel Salazar as Raúl García / Ricardo  
 Luis Aguilar as Alberto  
 Lilia del Valle as Irma  
 Ramón Gay as Arturo Robles  
 Pedro Vargas as Cantante  
 Fernando Fernández as Fernando 
 Enedina Díaz de León as Enedina  
 Salvador Quiroz as Don Antonio

References

Bibliography 
 María Luisa Amador. Cartelera cinematográfica, 1950-1959. UNAM, 1985.

External links 
 

1953 films
1950s thriller films
Mexican thriller films
1950s Spanish-language films
Mexican black-and-white films
1950s Mexican films